Living Doll(s) may refer to:

Film and television
 The Living Doll (1908 film) (French: La Poupée vivante), short silent film by Georges Méliès
 "Living Doll" (The Twilight Zone), 1963 episode of American TV series The Twilight Zone
 Living Doll, 1970 Filipino film starring Tony Ferrer
 Living Dolls (TV series), 1989 American sitcom
 Living Dolls: The Making of a Child Beauty Queen, 2001 American TV documentary
 "Living Doll" (CSI), 2007 episode of American TV series CSI: Crime Scene Investigation

Music
 "Living Doll" (song), by Lionel Bart, performed by Cliff Richard

See also
 Haunted doll, a doll or stuffed animal purported to be cursed or possessed in some way
 My Living Doll, American TV sitcom in 1964–65
 Living Dead Dolls, 1998 line of American horror dolls